The Catholic University of Utrecht or Catholic Theological University was a Roman Catholic pontifical university in Utrecht, Netherlands. The university was a public institution and was primarily focused on educating future Catholic priests. In 2006 the university merged into the larger University of Tilburg.

References

Catholic universities and colleges in the Netherlands
Defunct universities in the Netherlands
1967 establishments in the Netherlands
Educational institutions established in 1967
Educational institutions disestablished in 2006
Education in Utrecht (city)
History of Utrecht (city)
Tilburg University